The Technological University(Sittwe) (Burmese: နည္းပညာတကၠသုိလ္(စစ္ေတြ)) is located in Rachanbyin Village, Sittwe Township, Sittwe District, Rakhine State, Myanmar. It formerly operated as a Government Technical College (GTC). It moved to Rachanbyin Village and expanded to University level on 20 January 2007.

Departments
 Civil Engineering Department
 Mechanical  Engineering Department
 Electrical Power Engineering Department
 Electronic and Communication Engineering Department
 Engineering Physics Department
 Engineering Chemistry Department
 Engineering Mathematics Department
 English  Department
 Department of Myanmar

Program

References

Technological universities in Myanmar
Sittwe
Buildings and structures in Rakhine State